Skuqi is an Albanian surname. Notable people with the surname include:

Haki Abaz Skuqi (1958–1986), decorated Albanian pilot and crew commander
Luan Skuqi (born 1951), Albanian politician and former member of the Assembly of the Republic of Albania

Albanian-language surnames